European Railways Cup or European Railworks Cup or International Sports Railway Workers Union Cup or Cup of the European Sport Union of Railway Workers is a defunct friendly football club tournament.

Winners

Notes:
Note 1: Victory awarded to Yugoslavia who had more corner kicks.
Note 2:  Kairat Almaty was the first Soviet Team to win a European Cup.

Performances

By club

See also 

 Cup of the Alps

References

Defunct international club association football competitions in Europe